Holy Trinity Church is in Mount Pleasant, Blackburn, Lancashire, England.  It is a former Anglican parish church which is now redundant and under the care of the Churches Conservation Trust. It is recorded in the National Heritage List for England as a designated Grade II listed building.

History

The church was built between 1837 and 1846 at a cost of £5,019 (equivalent to £ in ).  It was a Commissioners' church, receiving a grant of £1,519 towards its cost from the Church Building Society. The church was designed by the Lancaster architect Edmund Sharpe, the project being instigated by the Rev J. W. Whittaker, Sharpe's cousin and the vicar of Blackburn. The foundation stone was laid on 11 October 1837 by Rev John Bird Sumner, then the Bishop of Chester. It opened for worship in January 1846, and was consecrated on 12 July of that year.  The church provided seating for 1,626 people.  The completion of the tower was delayed due to lack of funds until 1853, and the intended spire was never built.  In 1860 internal alterations were carried out under the direction of E. G. Paley, Sharpe's successor in the practice. The galleries were reconstructed and new stalls were added, providing 200 more seats. The organ was removed to a position behind the pulpit. These alterations cost over £1,000 (equivalent to £ in ).  Between 1942 and 1949 the vicar of the church was Chad Varah, who later founded The Samaritans. In 1946 the side galleries were removed, retaining the west gallery.  Holy Trinity was declared redundant on 1 April 1981, and was vested in the Trust on 18 May 1984.

Architecture

Exterior
Holy Trinity is designed in Gothic Revival style. Its plan consists of a three-bay nave with a clerestory, north and south lean-to aisles, north and south transepts rising to the full height of the nave, and a chancel.  The tower has three stages, with lancet windows in the lower stages and two twin-light louvre style bell openings on each side in the top stage. At the summit is a plain parapet with a pinnacle at each corner. All the windows are tall.  At the east ends of the transepts and the chancel, the window arrangement is unusual, consisting of 2-3-2 lights, a feature more commonly found in Germany.

Interior
Internally there are slim compound piers and a west gallery. The ceiling is flat and divided into 80 panels by moulded ribs. Each of the panels contains a painting of a coat of arms. At the centre of the crossing are the royal coat of arms of Queen Victoria.  Elsewhere are the arms of the other monarchs, going back to Edward the Confessor, bishops and other churchmen (including Whittaker), and William Whewell (one of Sharpe's patrons).  The painters employed included William Birch, Benjamin West, John Brocklehurst and Samuel Driver.  The organ was moved from Hanover Square Rooms, London. It was rebuilt and restored by Gray and Davidson in 1851 and installed in the west gallery. At a later date it was moved to the southeast of the chancel and rebuilt. In 1937 it was rebuilt again and enlarged by Laycock and Bannister of Keighley.

Assessment

The church was designated as a Grade II listed church on 13 May 1987. It is Sharpe's largest and grandest church.  Sharpe's biographer, John Hughes, describes it as his pièce de résistance.

See also

Listed buildings in Blackburn
List of architectural works by Edmund Sharpe
List of Commissioners' churches in Northeast and Northwest England
List of churches preserved by the Churches Conservation Trust in Northern England

References and notes
Notes

Citations

Sources

Churches preserved by the Churches Conservation Trust
Grade II listed churches in Lancashire
Gothic Revival church buildings in England
Gothic Revival architecture in Lancashire
Churches completed in 1853
19th-century Church of England church buildings
Diocese of Blackburn
Edmund Sharpe buildings
Commissioners' church buildings
Holy Trinity Church
Former Church of England church buildings
Church of England church buildings in Lancashire